Sulfatolamide is a drug used in gynecology.  It is a combination of two sulfonamide antibacterials, sulfathiourea and mafenide.

References

Sulfonamide antibiotics
Combination drugs